This is a list of statutory instruments made in the United Kingdom in the year 2017.

1–100

101–200

201–300

301–400

401–500

501–600

601–700

701–800

801–900

901–1000

1001–1100

1101–1335

See also

List of Statutory Instruments of the United Kingdom, 2016

List of Statutory Instruments of the United Kingdom, 2018

List of Statutory Instruments of the United Kingdom, 2019

List of Statutory Instruments of the United Kingdom, 2020

Notes

References

Law of the United Kingdom
Lists of Statutory Instruments of the United Kingdom